John Barbour (born April 24, 1933) is a Canadian actor, comedian, and television host who has worked extensively in the United States. Barbour is the only performer in TV to win Emmys for both entertainment and news shows. Barbour is known as one of the hosts of the NBC reality television series Real People, for which he was also a creator and co-producer.

Career
Born in Toronto, Ontario, Barbour moved to the United States in the early 1960s. His comedy act, particularly his 1965 album It's Tough to Be White, dealt in part with civil rights and black-white relations. In 1971, he hosted a local daytime talk show on CBS-owned KNXT (now KCBS-TV) in Los Angeles.  Barbour would later do a brief stint in Chicago as co-host of AM Chicago on ABC-owned WLS-TV in 1978.

Barbour is perhaps best known for creating and appearing in the hit 1970s TV show Real People. He also hosted the pilot for The Gong Show in the mid-1970s (walking away from the show in objection to its farcical premise and forcing producer Chuck Barris to step in front of the cameras as host), and was a regular panelist on the 1988 Canadian (US syndicated) version of Liar's Club.

Barbour portrayed game show host Harry Monte in a 1975 episode of Sanford and Son.

Barbour was the executive producer of the game show That **** Quiz Show (That Awful! Quiz Show) hosted by Greg & John Rice in 1982.

Barbour wrote and narrated Keith Burns' documentary Ernie Kovacs: Television's Original Genius.

He also directed and wrote the 1992 documentary The JFK Assassination: The Jim Garrison Tapes. This film covers the investigation of District Attorney Jim Garrison, who, after the 1963 assassination of John F. Kennedy, decided to further investigate the official report given by the Warren Commission. The documentary hypothesizes connections between the assassination and the FBI, the CIA, the Mafia, the Cuban Missile Crisis, the Vietnam War, and other organizations and foreign affairs issues. The film won an award in 1993 at the San Sebastian Film Festival in Spain.

He directed and wrote another documentary, “The American Media And The Second Assassination of President John F. Kennedy,” which released to specific audiences in 2017, but saw a broader audience in 2019 when it was showcased in iTunes, Vimeo and Amazon. This follow-up documentary is an extension of his critically acclaimed "The Garrison Tapes," and has received significant praise for its detail and exposition on the subjects of the JFK murder and the evolution of contemporary Fake News. IMdB has scored the documentary 8.6 out of a possible 10.

References

Further reading
John Barbour. Your Mother's Not a Virgin!: The Bumpy Life and Times of the Canadian Dropout who changed the Face of American TV!. Trine Day, 2019.

External links
VH1: John Barbour bio

Watch
 John Barbour's documentary Ernie Kovacs: Television's Original Genius at John Barbour's World

1933 births
Living people
Canadian expatriate male actors in the United States
Male actors from Toronto